Amy Prentiss is an American police drama television series that originally aired on NBC.

Description 
Amy Prentiss was a spinoff of Ironside (the pilot was a two-hour episode of that show) and like that series was set in San Francisco. NBC executives initially rejected the program as a series, but high ratings for the pilot changed their minds.

The show aired as part of the NBC Mystery Movie in 1974–1975, replacing Hec Ramsey, but was canceled after three 2-hour episodes.

Jessica Walter stars as Amy Prentiss, a relatively young investigator who becomes the first female Chief of Detectives for the San Francisco Police Department following the previous chief's death. She is a single mother whose husband died in a plane crash. Prentiss faced opposition from other police officers and from officers' wives.

Helen Hunt, in an early recurring role, plays Prentiss' pre-teen daughter, Jill. Other actors and the characters they portrayed are Steve Sandor as Tony Russell, Arthur Metrano as Rod Pena, Johnny Seven as detective Contreras, and Gwenn Mitchell as Joan Carter.

Guest stars in the series' brief run included William Shatner, Cameron Mitchell, Ron Thompson, Don Murray, Joyce Van Patten and Jamie Farr.

Recognition
In 1975, Walter won the Emmy Award for Outstanding Lead Actress in a Limited Series for her work in Amy Prentiss.

Episodes
The pilot for this series was the two-part Ironside episode "Amy Prentiss," a.k.a. "The Chief" (May 23, 1974).

References

External links

1970s American crime drama television series
Television series by Universal Television
NBC Mystery Movie
1974 American television series debuts
1975 American television series endings
Television shows set in San Francisco
American television spin-offs
NBC original programming
English-language television shows